Gruszowski - is a Polish Coat of Arms. It was used by several szlachta families in the times of the Polish–Lithuanian Commonwealth.

History

Blazon

Notable bearers
Notable bearers of this Coat of Arms include:

See also
 Polish heraldry
 Heraldry
 Coat of Arms

Polish coats of arms